Submariner is the debut studio album from The Dead Science, released in 2003 on Absolutely Kosher Records. Its contributors include jazz musician Michael White.

Track listing
 "Unseeing Eye"  – 7:04
 "White Cane"  – 3:40
 "White Train"  – 4:17
 "The Ghost Integrity"  – 4:43
 "Below"  – 4:53
 "Batty"  – 4:17
 "Girl With the Unseen Hand"  – 4:48
 "Threnody"  – 3:45
 "Tension at Pitch"  – 7:26
 "Envelope"  – 2:20

References

External links
 Lyrics from official band site
 MP3 of "White Train" (from record label)
 MP3 of "Batty" and "Threnody" (from official band site)
 Absolutely Kosher (record label)
 Woodson Lateral (record label)

2003 debut albums
The Dead Science albums
Absolutely Kosher Records albums